Measure for Measure is a 2020 Australian drama film written by Damian Hill and Paul Ireland, directed by Ireland and starring Hugo Weaving.  It is based on the play of the same title by William Shakespeare.

Cast
Hugo Weaving as Duke
Harrison Gilbertson as Claudio
Megan Smart as Jaiwara
Mark Leonard Winter as Angelo
Daniel Henshall as Lukey
Fayssal Bazzi as Farouk
Doris Younane as Karima

Release
In June 2020, it was announced that the North American distribution rights to the film were acquired by Samuel Goldwyn Films.  The film was released on demand and digital on September 4, 2020.

Reception
The film has a 36% rating on Rotten Tomatoes based on 28 reviews.

Robin Holabird of KUNR gave the film a positive review and wrote, "By all measures, this Measure for Measure totals up into an absorbing cinematic experience."

Josiah Teal of Film Threat gave the film an 8 out of 10 and wrote, "...the film discusses issues such as multiculturalism, gender, drugs, and religion in a way that is increasingly relevant in 2020 without ever feeling heavy-handed."

Monica Castillo of RogerEbert.com awarded the film two stars and wrote, "However, there’s a lot going on in the movie without ever really exploring those topics beyond a cursory mention."

John DeFore of The Hollywood Reporter gave the film a negative review and wrote, "Shakespeare scholars have often labeled Measure for Measure a 'problem play,' a term that has been given multiple meanings; Ireland’s tonally ambivalent film fits one of those meanings pretty well."

Jeannette Catsoulis of The New York Times also gave the film a negative review and wrote, "Convoluted and ponderously paced, Measure for Measure relies too often on sentimental music and narrative shorthand."

References

External links
 
 

2020 drama films
Australian drama films
Films based on works by William Shakespeare
Works based on Measure for Measure